Kirkmabreck is a civil parish in the historic county of Kirkcudbrightshire in the Dumfries and Galloway council area, Scotland.

Situated in the historic Stewartry of Kirkcudbright, and centred on the small town of Creetown on the east bank of the River Cree, it stretches north to the parishes of Minnigaff and Girthon, and west to Anwoth. Kirkmabreck also includes the small settlement of Carsluith, dominated by the eponymous castle which is in the care of Historic Scotland. It covers approximately 25,000 acres. Kirkmabreck was one of two parishes from Kirkcudbrightshire which were included in the Wigtown District which existed from 1975 to 1996, and as such forms part of the Wigtown lieutenancy area rather than the Stewartry of Kirkcudbright lieutenancy.

Apart from Carsluith Castle, the other antiquities of note in the parish are at Cairnholy, also managed by Historic Scotland, the stone circle at Glenquicken and cup and ring marked stones and castle at Barholm.

Thomas Brown, the metaphysician (1778–1820), was born in the parish and was buried here.

Military road
Heading west from Creetown and connecting with the Corse of Slakes road is an old military track built in the mid 18th century over an existing drove road to serve as a troop access route to and from Ireland.

References

Galloway
Kirkcudbrightshire
Parishes in Dumfries and Galloway